Oleg Denishchik (born 10 November 1969) is a retired triple jumper who represented the USSR and later Belarus. His personal best jump was 17.53 metres, achieved in July 1991 in Kyiv. He twice competed at the World Championships in Athletics, reaching the final on both occasions. He was a one-time national champion at the Belarusian Athletics Championships, winning the men's triple jump in 1993. He was runner-up at the 1991 Soviet Athletics Championships.

International competitions

National titles
Belarusian Athletics Championships
Triple jump: 1993

References

1969 births
Living people
Soviet male triple jumpers
Belarusian male triple jumpers
World Athletics Championships athletes for Belarus
World Athletics Championships athletes for the Soviet Union